Yu-bin, also spelled Yoo-bin, is a Korean unisex given name. Its meaning depends on the hanja used to write each syllable of the name.

Hanja and meaning
There are 62 hanja with the reading "yu" and 25 hanja with the reading "bin" on the South Korean government's official list of hanja which may be used in given names. Some ways of writing this name in hanja include:

: "possessing elegance"
: "charming and elegant" ( is a variant of )

People
People with this name include:
Kim Yu-bin (musician) (born 1988), South Korean female singer, former member of girl group Wonder Girls
Song Yuvin (born Song Yu-bin, 1998), South Korean male singer, former member of boy bands Myteen and B.O.Y
Lee Yu-bin (born 2001), South Korean female short track speed skater
Kim Yoo-bin (actress) (born 2005), South Korean actress

See also
List of Korean given names

References

Korean unisex given names